Let's Dance 2018 is the thirteenth season of the Swedish celebrity dancing TV-series Let's Dance, the season premiered on TV4 23 March 2018. The show is presented by Tilde de Paula Eby and David Hellenius.

English dancer Aaron Brown from the UK version of Strictly Come Dancing competes for the first time.

Couples

Scoring chart

Red numbers indicate the lowest score of each week.
Green number indicate the highest score of each week.
 indicates the couple that was eliminated that week.
 indicates the couple received the lowest score of the week and were eliminated.
 indicates the couple finished in the bottom two.
 indicates the couple earned immunity from elimination.
 indicates the winning couple.
 indicates the runner-up couple.
 indicates the third place couple.

Average chart
 Points awarded by guest judges and bonus points from dance marathons will not be included.

References

2018
TV4 (Sweden) original programming
2018 Swedish television seasons